This list of churches in  Faxe Municipality lists church buildings in Faxe Municipality, Denmark. The municipality is located on the southeastern part of Zealand.

Overview
Faxe Municipality belongs to the Diocese of Roskilde, a diocese within the Evangelical Lutheran Church of Denmark. It is divided into 20 parishes.

List

See also
 List of churches in Vordingborg Municipality

References

External links

 Nordens kirker: Nordvestsjælland

 
Faxe